Uiam Dam is a dam in Uiam-ri, Shindong-myeon, Chuncheon, South Korea. It dams the Bukhan River.
Built in 1967, it is operated by Korea Hydro & Nuclear Power. It is cited as "one of North Han's major hydroelectric projects". The dam's reservoir formed three small islands when constructed.

References

Dams in South Korea
Dams completed in 1967